Hatch is an unincorporated community in Ralls County, in the U.S. state of Missouri.

History
A post office called Hatch was established in 1883, and remained in operation until 1905. The community has the name of William H. Hatch (1833–1896), a U.S. Representative from Missouri.

References

Unincorporated communities in Ralls County, Missouri
Unincorporated communities in Missouri